Sumardi Hajalan (born 12 January 1985 in Tawau, Sabah) is a former Malaysian footballer.

Career

Club
At club level, Sumardi spent most of his career at Sabah where he made his debut against Penang during the second leg of 2004 Malaysia FA Cup. He also played for Johor FC, Negeri Sembilan, and Perlis. He signed with Perak in 2015 but only made an appearances in the 2015 Malaysia Cup against ATM.

International
At international level, Sumardi made his first appearances with Malaysia national under 23 team at the 2005 AFF U-23 Youth Championship under Bertalan Bisckei. He became a regular with the Malaysia U-23 national team in 2007 under B. Sathianathan. He played in the 2007 Merdeka Tournament, in which he started as the first choice left back for the entire tournament as Malaysia won the trophy after 14 years. He also participated at the 2007 Southeast Asian Games. He made his international senior debut in the 2010 World Cup qualifiers against Bahrain on 21 October 2007.

References

External links
 
 

1985 births
Living people
Malaysian footballers
Malaysia international footballers
Sabah F.C. (Malaysia) players
Perak F.C. players
Negeri Sembilan FA players
People from Sabah
Association football defenders